The Big Ten All-Tournament Team is an honor bestowed at the conclusion of the NCAA Division I Big Ten Conference tournament to the players judged to have performed the best during the championship game. The team is composed of three forwards, two defensemen and one goaltender with additional players named in the event of a tie. Voting for the honor is conducted by the head coaches of each member team once the tournament has completed and any player regardless of their team's finish is eligible.

The All-Tournament Team began being awarded after the first championship in 2014, following the dissolution of the CCHA conference in 2013.

All-Tournament Teams

2010s

2020s

All-Tournament Team players by school

Multiple appearances

References

College ice hockey trophies and awards in the United States
^